The 1903 Italian Football Championship season was won by Genoa.

Qualifications

|}

Semifinal

|}

Final
Played on April 13

|}

References and sources
Almanacco Illustrato del Calcio - La Storia 1898-2004, Panini Edizioni, Modena, September 2005

1903
1902–03 in European association football leagues
1902–03 in Italian football